Albertville Premium Outlets is an outlet center mall located in the Minneapolis-St. Paul, Minnesota metropolitan area, in the northwest suburb of Albertville, Minnesota.  Albertville Premium Outlets is owned and managed by Simon Property Group.  The center features over 100 stores, including Ralph Lauren, Nike, Coach, Lucky Brand Jeans, Puma and more.

Albertville Premium Outlets has one anchor store located on their property, Ashley Home Furniture Studio. Also, Albertville Premium Outlets is home to a few dining options, which include TCBY Yogurt, Burger King, Five Guys, Starbucks, and Subway.

Albertville Premium Outlets was once the only Simon Premium Outlets location in Minnesota, until Twin Cities Premium Outlets, an outlet mall in Eagan, Minnesota, opened in 2014.

Anchor stores
 Ashley Home Furniture Studio

Renovations
Albertville Premium Outlets decided to undergo a renovation in 2004, which added 40 more stores on the other side on County Road 19 in Albertville, Minnesota. The original side on the outlets has a little over 70 stores and Ashley Home Furniture Studio.

References

Shopping malls in Minnesota
Outlet malls in the United States
Premium Outlets
Buildings and structures in Wright County, Minnesota
Tourist attractions in Wright County, Minnesota
Shopping malls established in 2000
2000 establishments in Minnesota